Anelaphus asperus is a species of beetle in the family Cerambycidae. It was described by Knull in 1962.

References

asperus
Beetles described in 1962